Pinoy Abroad is a Philippine television travel documentary show broadcast by GMA Network. Hosted by Ivan Mayrina and Rhea Santos, it premiered on April 6, 2005. The show concluded on June 28, 2006.

Countries visited
North America

Europe

Asia

Africa

Oceania

Accolades

References

External links
 

2005 Philippine television series debuts
2006 Philippine television series endings
Filipino-language television shows
GMA Network original programming
GMA Integrated News and Public Affairs shows
Philippine documentary television series
Philippine travel television series